Richard Walton may refer to:

Richard J. Walton (1928–2012), an American politician and writer
Richard Guy Walton (1914–2005), American muralist, including at Federal Building and U.S. Courthouse (Reno, Nevada)
Richard R. Walton (1909–1993), American inventor
Richard Walton (rugby league)
Richard Walton (American football)
Richard Walton, character in Where Are My Children?
Dick Walton (1924–2012), English footballer

See also
Walton (surname)